An earthquake occurred on September 2, 2009 at 14:55:01 local time in West Java, Indonesia. The magnitude 7.0 earthquake killed at least 81 people, injured over 1,297, and displaced over 210,000 (including more than 140,000 in Tasikmalaya regency). The quake was felt in the capital Jakarta, although damage there was minimal, and it was Indonesia's deadliest earthquake since the 2006 Pangandaran earthquake and tsunami.

Cause
The earthquake's focus lies close to the major fault plane where the Indo-Australian Plate is being subducted beneath the Eurasian Plate. However, the focal mechanisms determined for this event shows reverse faulting at a high angle to the trend of the subduction zone and it has been suggested that the cause was deformation within the descending slab. Analysis of GPS data, tsunami run-ups and the effect of stress transfer compared to aftershock distribution supports a west-dipping reverse fault.

Another earthquake in the same subduction zone occurred only 5 days later in the ocean south of Yogyakarta. This newer quake (magnitude 6.2) is considered to be related to the West Java earthquake.

Damage
Buildings in Bandung and Tasikmalaya, the town closest to the epicenter, were damaged, and hundreds of people were injured. An estimated 18,300 homes and offices were earlier thought to have been damaged. This figure later rose to 87,000.

The quake was felt in Jakarta, Indonesia's capital; causing evacuation in many office buildings and hotels. Several office buildings along major thoroughfares in Central Jakarta suffered damage.

At least 11 houses were covered by a landslide in Cianjur.

Around 37 inhabitants, including 13 children, of Cikangkareng were affected by a landslide caused by the quake and are thought to have been buried beneath rubble. The area has become a breeding ground for voyeurs who are flocking to the area to take photographs of the destruction and victims.

At least one hospital was destroyed by the quake.

Victims
Confirmed death tolls by area were issued by The Jakarta Post on 4 September.

See also
List of earthquakes in 2009
List of earthquakes in Indonesia

References

External links
 Death toll rises in Indonesia quake – video from Al Jazeera
 7.0 Magnitude Earthquake Rattles Indonesia – video from the Associated Press
 Photos at the Toronto Sun
 
 

Earthquakes in Java
West Java
West Java earthquake
Earthquakes in Indonesia
History of Java
September 2009 events in Asia